Magalirkkaga  is a 2000 Indian Tamil-language drama film written and directed by Indhiyan. The film stars Khushbu, Vindhya, Kovai Sarala, and Ranjith while Thalaivasal Vijay, Devan, Anuja, and Vadivelu play supporting roles. The music for the film was composed by debutant Varshan and the film opened to mixed reviews in June 2000.

Plot

Bhavani is a no-nonsense inspector at a police station composed primarily of female officers, consisting of a head constable, two constables, and a driver Bhupathi. Bhavani is engaged to the engineer Subramani, whom her family had helped support financially. They are shown to be a happy couple. Tragedy strikes when Deputy Commissioner Nagaraj, aided by the unapologetically corrupt Assistant Commissioner, sexually assaults Chithra. Bhavani is determined to get justice for her subordinate but faces numerous ordeals, including having to choose between her fiancé and her morals.

Cast

 Khushbu as Bhavani
 Vindhya as Chithra
 Kovai Sarala as Rosa
 Ranjith as Subramani
 Ambika as Panchavanam
 Thalaivasal Vijay as Nagaraj I.P.S
 Devan as Mathivanan, IG
 Anuja as Assistant Commissioner
 Vadivelu as Bhupathi
 Jai Ganesh as Bhavani's father
 Vadivukkarasi as Subramani's mother
 Vennira Aadai Moorthy as Rosa's father
Crane Manohar as Azhagurasa

Soundtrack
The soundtrack was composed by Varshan and the lyrics were written by Annaadhasan, Thamarai, Ponniyin Selvan, Arivumathi and Kannabalan.
"Kosuvam Sorugi" — SPB Charan, Swarnalatha
"Nootrandu" — Febi, Ganga
"Therkathi Mappillai" — Vadivelu, Kovai Sarala
"Siragugal Indri" — Sujatha Mohan
"Pudhu Rosapoo" — Harini

Reception
A critic from The Hindu wrote "'[Magalirkkaga]' has a message. But director Indian should have coated it with sugar. He thought that the antics of Vadivelu and Kovai Sarala would help make it enjoyable but he has been proved wrong. The director's intentions are right but he must have taken care while writing the screenplay." In addition, a reviewer from New Straits Times called it "a treat for everyone for the family". A critic from the entertainment portal Tamil Movie Cafe noted "the film is well-intentioned, but never really takes off".

References

2000 films
2000s Tamil-language films
Fictional portrayals of the Tamil Nadu Police
2000 directorial debut films